Katrina Law is an American actress.  She is known for playing the roles of Mira on the Starz television series Spartacus: Blood and Sand and Spartacus: Vengeance, Nyssa al Ghul on The CW television series Arrow, Karen Beach on the Sony Crackle series The Oath, Quinn Liu on the CBS series Hawaii Five-0 and Jessica Knight on the CBS series NCIS.

Early life
Law was born in Philadelphia and grew up in Deptford Township, New Jersey. Her mother is Taiwanese and her father is of German and Italian descent. As a teenager, she was crowned Miss New Jersey Teen USA. She graduated from the Richard Stockton College of New Jersey with a B.A. in Performing Arts (Theatre Performance) in 1999.

Career
Law worked alongside director Adrian Picardi with producers Eric Ro and Don Le, to create a low budget web series called The Resistance. Picardi was the series' official creator and director. The show was later picked up by Starz which led to Law's casting in Spartacus: Blood and Sand in 2009. In 2011, Law completed an action-oriented project called 3 Minutes with director Ross Ching, producers Don Le and George Wang, starring Harry Shum Jr., Stephen "tWitch" Boss (the runner up on season 4 of Fox's So You Think You Can Dance), and herself.

From 2014 to 2020, she had a recurring role on The CW television series Arrow as Nyssa al Ghul, the daughter of the notorious leader of the League of Assassins, Ra's al Ghul.

In 2019, Law was cast as co-lead in the CBS pilot Alive, as medical examiner Elizabeth Lavenza, whose husband Mark Escher (Ryan Phillipe) is brought back to life by the mysterious Dr Frankenstein (Aaron Staton). Later that year she joined the cast of CBS's Hawaii Five-0 for the series' tenth season. In March 2021, Law was cast in the eighteenth season of NCIS in the role of Jessica Knight. She appeared in the final two episodes of the season with the potential to become a series regular if the series is renewed for a nineteenth season; it was later confirmed that Law would become a series regular beginning with the nineteenth season. In January 2022, it was announced that Law's NCIS character would cross over to NCIS: Hawaiʻi for an episode.

Personal life
Law married actor Keith Andreen in January 2013. In December 2018, she gave birth to a daughter.

Filmography

Film

Television

References

External links

 
 
 

21st-century American actresses
Actresses from New Jersey
American actresses of Taiwanese descent
American people of German descent
American people of Italian descent
American people of Taiwanese descent
American television actresses
People from Philadelphia
Living people
People from Deptford Township, New Jersey
Year of birth missing (living people)